The 84th Flying Training Squadron is part of the United States Air Force 47th Flying Training Wing based at Laughlin Air Force Base, Texas. It operates Beechcraft T-6 Texan II aircraft conducting flight training.

History

World War II
The squadron was activated in 1942, as the 84th Pursuit Squadron (Interceptor). Soon after its activation the US Army transferred the squadron to England where it lost a majority of its pilots and planes to the American war effort in North Africa. During the war the 84th flew missions ranging from bomber escort, ground attack, counter-air, and close air support.

In April 1943, the unit was involved in its first combat mission in North Africa. In June 1944, the 84th supported the Allied landings at Normandy and directly contributed to the breakthrough at Saint-Lô in July 1944. In September 1944, the squadron contributed to the Allied victory in the Arnhem-Nijmegen airborne landings; notably, they suppressed numerous ground positions during the airborne assault and were credited with saving scores of American and British troop transports. For this action the 84th received the Distinguished Unit Citation.

In December 1944 the 84th began flying the North American P-51 Mustang. They used their new plane very successfully and on 10 April destroyed 58 aircraft on the ground earning the 84th its second Distinguished Unit Citation. In April 1945 the 84th flew its last combat mission escorting British bombers on their way to Hitler's "Eagles Nest". The squadron completed three years overseas and was credited with 260 Luftwaffe aircraft destroyed.

Air Defense Command

The 84th served as part of the occupation forces until it transferred to the United States in June 1947, where it eventually assumed an air defense mission. Assigned to Air Defense Command and again equipped with Mustangs at Hamilton Air Force Base, California with a mission for the air defense of San Francisco and the Bay Area. It was upgraded to Republic F-84D Thunderjet jet aircraft in 1949, and equipped with first-generation Northrop F-89B Scorpions in 1951. During the 1950s the 84th FIS operated both the Lockheed F-94B and F-94C Starfire aircraft as well as 4 versions of the Northrop F-89 Scorpion (B,D,H,J variants). In 1960 it received the new McDonnell F-101B Voodoo supersonic interceptor, and the F-101F operational and conversion trainer. The two-seat trainer version was equipped with dual controls, but carried the same armament as the F-101B and were fully combat-capable.

On 22 October 1962, before President John F. Kennedy told Americans that missiles were in place in Cuba, the squadron dispersed one third of its force, equipped with nuclear tipped missiles to Kingsley Field at the start of the Cuban Missile Crisis. These planes returned to Hamilton after the crisis. Although the number of ADC interceptor squadrons remained almost constant in the early 1960s, attrition (and the fact that production lines closed in 1961) caused a gradual drop in the number of planes assigned to a squadron, from 24 to typically 18 by 1964. To make up for attrition of F-101s, ADC inactivated the 83d Fighter-Interceptor Squadron at Hamilton. Six of these aircraft were retained at Hamilton and the 84th's strength went from 18 to 24 aircraft

In 1966, F-101s were featured in the film The Russians Are Coming, the Russians Are Coming. The F-101Bs were transferred to the Air National Guard and 1968 and replaced by Convair F-106 Delta Darts.

It moved to Castle Air Force Base, California in 1973 as part of the shutdown of Hamilton. It was inactivated in 1981 as the interceptor mission was being transferred to the Air National Guard.

Tactical Air Command
In July 1981 the squadron was redesignated the 84th Fighter Interceptor Training Squadron and received a fleet of Lockheed T-33 T-Birds to train in, specializing in electronic counter-countermeasures training. It participated in live flying exercises as targets for various air divisions and for the McDonnell Douglas F-15 Eagles of the 49th Tactical Fighter Wing. The squadron also flew target missions for the weapons controller training program until early 1987 when it was inactivated.

Modern era
In April 1990 the squadron was resurrected to meet the increased demand for pilots. The 84th was designated a Flying Training Squadron and joined the 85th Flying Training Squadron in training pilots in the Cessna T-37 Tweet at Laughlin Air Force Base. Again yielding to changes in pilot production the squadron was inactivated in October 1992. In 1998 pilot production increased again and the 84th was reactivated on 1 October 1998.

Lineage
 Constituted as the 84th Pursuit Squadron (Interceptor) on 13 January 1942
 Activated on 9 February 1942
 Redesignated 84th Pursuit Squadron (Interceptor) (Twin Engine) on 22 April 1942
 Redesignated 84th Fighter Squadron (Twin Engine) on 15 May 1942
 Redesignated 84th Fighter Squadron on 1 March 1943
 Redesignated 84th Fighter Squadron, Single Engine on 21 August 1944
 Inactivated on 18 October 1945
 Activated on 20 August 1946
 Redesignated 84th Fighter Squadron, Jet on 24 September 1948
 Redesignated 84th Fighter-Interceptor Squadron on 20 January 1950
 Redesignated 84th Fighter Interceptor Training Squadron on 1 July 1981
 Inactivated on 27 February 1987
 Redesignated 84th Flying Training Squadron on 9 February 1990
 Activated on 2 April 1990
 Inactivated on 1 October 1992
 Activated on 1 October 1998
 Inactivated 24 August 2012

Assignments
 78th Pursuit Group (later 78th Fighter Group), 9 February 1942 – 18 October 1945
 78th Fighter Group (later 78th Fighter-Interceptor Group), 20 August 1946
 4702d Defense Wing, 6 February 1952
 28th Air Division, 7 November 1952
 566th Air Defense Group, 16 February 1953
 78th Fighter Group, 18 August 1955
 78th Fighter Wing, 1 February 1961
 1st Fighter Wing, 31 December 1969
 26th Air Division, 1 October 1970 – 27 February 1987
 47th Flying Training Wing, 2 April 1990
 47th Operations Group, 15 December 1991 – 1 October 1992
 47th Operations Group, 1 October 1998 – 24 August 2012

Stations

 Baer Field, Indiana, 9 February 1942
 Muroc Army Air Field, California, 30 April 1942
 Oakland Airport, California, 11 May 1942
 Hamilton Field, California, 4 November 1942 – 10 November 1942
 RAF Goxhill (AAF-345), England, 1 December 1942
 RAF Duxford (AAF-357), England, 1 April 1943 – 11 October 1945

 Camp Kilmer, New Jersey, 16 October 1945 – 18 October 1945
 AAF Station Straubing, Germany, 20 August 1946 – 25 June 1947
 Mitchel Field, New York, 25 June 1947
 Hamilton Air Force Base, California, 24 November 1948
 Castle Air Force Base, California, 1 September 1973 – 27 February 1987
 Laughlin Air Force Base, Texas, 2 April 1990 – 1 October 1992
 Laughlin Air Force Base, Texas, 1 October 1998 – 24 August 2012

Aircraft

 Lockheed P-38 Lightning (1942–1943)
 Republic P-47 Thunderbolt (1943–1944)
 North American P-51 Mustang (1944–1945, 1949–1951)
 Republic F-84D Thunderjet (1949–1951)
 North American F-89B Scorpion (1951–1953)
 Lockheed F-94B Starfire, (1953)
 Lockheed F-94C Starfire, (1953–1956)
 Northrop F-89D Scorpion, (1956–1957)
 Northrop F-89J Scorpion, (1957–1959)
 McDonnell F-101B Voodoo (1959–1968)
 Convair F-106 Delta Dart (1968–1981)
 Lockheed T-33 T-Bird (1981–1987)
 Cessna T-37 Tweet (1990–1992, 1998–2003)
 Beechcraft T-6 Texan II (2002–2012)

See also

References

Notes

Bibliography

 
 
 McMullen, Richard F. (1964) "The Fighter Interceptor Force 1962-1964" ADC Historical Study No. 27, Air Defense Command, Ent Air Force Base, CO (Confidential, declassified 22 March 2000)
 NORAD/CONAD Participation in the Cuban Missile Crisis, Historical Reference Paper No. 8, Directorate of Command History Continental Air Defense Command, Ent AFB, CO, 1 Feb 63 (Top Secret NOFORN declassified 9 March 1996)
 "ADCOM's Fighter Interceptor Squadrons". The Interceptor (January 1979) Aerospace Defense Command, (Volume 21, Number 1)

External links
 USAF 84th Flying Training Squadron History
 84th Flying Training Squadron Fact Sheet

0084